Michael Keith may refer to:

 Michael Keith, 13th Earl of Kintore (1939–2004), Scottish peer and nobleman
 Michael C. Keith (born 1945), American media historian and author
 Michael Keith, musician in 112

See also
 Mike Keith (disambiguation)
 Michael Keefe (1844–1933), building contractor and political figure in Nova Scotia, Canada
 Michael O'Keefe (disambiguation)